Ludwig Philipp Scharwenka (16 February 1847, in Szamotuły [Samter], Grand Duchy of Posen – 16 July 1917, in Bad Nauheim) was a German-Polish composer and teacher of music. He was the older brother of Xaver Scharwenka.

Early training 
Scharwenka was born in Szamotuły (Samter), Grand Duchy of Posen. Like his younger brother Xaver he received his first intermittent musical instruction in Posen (today Poznań). After the closure of the Gymnasium (college) in 1865 he studied music theory together with his brother under Richard Wüerst and Heinrich Dorn at the new Musical Academy in Berlin where, from 1868, he himself was taken on as teacher of Theory and Composition. In this period his own first compositions appeared. In 1874 he brought out an overture and a symphony for the first time in a concert of his own.

Compositions 
His many teaching obligations notwithstanding, Philipp Scharwenka stood in the front line as a composer and was recognised as such during his lifetime. His compositions include three Symphonies, Symphonic Poems, a Violin concerto, some Choral works (of which Sakuntala became very famous), the 4-act opera Roland, as well as numerous instrumental works such as Sonatas, Quartets, Caprices and Dances. Many of the major conductors of the period, including Arthur Nikisch, Anton Seidl and Hans Richter, performed his orchestral works. He is still known for his chamber works, including two piano trios, two trios for violin, viola, and piano, two violin sonatas, one viola sonata, one cello sonata, two string quartets, and one  piano quintet.  

In contrast to his brother's very extroverted compositions, Philipp's many-sided works have dreamlike and thoroughly moody inflections. His best-liked works are the chamber works beginning in 1896, which maintain traditional formal models and show considerable variety of melodic and rhythmical invention. In them Scharwenka achieved (despite the conservative restraints of the time in which he was writing) through very refined compositional techniques, something approaching an impressionistic tonal palette. These works found such distinguished interpreters as Willy Burmester, Julius Klengel and Moritz Meyer-Mahr.

One of his admirers was Max Reger, who in 1898 dedicated his Phantasiestücke op. 26 to him. In the context of the 37th Composer-Congress in 1900, his Dramatic Fantasy for Orchestra op 108, being crowned with a prize by the National German Music-Society, was performed in Bremen.

Conservatory director 
At the opening of the Scharwenka-Conservatory in Berlin, his brother Xaver entrusted to him in 1881 the direction of the Theory and Composition teaching, and then in 1891 that of the sister-conservatory in New York. Philipp however returned to Berlin in 1892 to take control of the Conservatory there, which in 1893 he merged with the Piano School of Karl Klindworth to form the Klindworth-Scharwenka Conservatory. This went on to become an outstanding institution in the musical landscape of Berlin. As Director of the Conservatory, Scharwenka remained active until his death in 1917. Otto Klemperer studied with him in Berlin, and Oskar Fried was another very distinguished pupil of his.

Other 
In 1880 Philipp married violin virtuoso Marianne Scharwenka (Marianne Stresow, d. 1918).  In 1937 his son Walter Scharwenka took over as director at the Conservatory.

Also Scharwenka possessed a remarkable talent as graphic illustrator, which is seen, for instance, in the drastic-humorous Figures for Alexander Moszkowski's satire, Anton Notenquetscher.

Works

Symphonies 
 Symphony No. 1, Herbstfeier, for Soli, Choir and Orchestra on a text by Friedrich Timpe, Op. 44
 Symphony No. 2 in D minor, Op. 96
 Symphony No. 3, Sinfonia Brevis in E flat major, Op. 115

Orchestral 
 Serenade for Orchestra, Op. 19
 Two Polish Folk Dances for Orchestra, Op. 20
 Wald- & Berggeister (Forest and Mountain Sprites), Intermezzo for Orchestra, Op. 37
 Liebesnacht (Love Night), Fantasiestück for Orchestra, Op. 40
 Fest-Ouvertüre (Festive Overture) for Orchestra, Op. 43
 Arkadische Suite (Arcadian Suite) in B flat major for Orchestra, Op. 76
 Frühlingswogen (Spring Waves) for Orchestra, Op. 87
 Traum & Wirklichkeit (Dream and Reality) for Orchestra, Op. 92
 Dramatische Phantasie (Dramatic Fantasy) for Orchestra, Op. 108

Concertos 
 Violin Concerto in G major, Op. 95

Chamber music 
 Romanze und Scherzo for Violin and Piano, Op. 10
 3 Konzertstücke for Violin and Piano, Op. 17
 Cavatine for Cello and Piano, Op. 22
 Piano Trio No. 1 in F minor, Op. 26
 Arie for Violin and Piano, Op. 51
 Barcarolle und Polonaise for Violin and Piano, Op. 52
 4 Stücke for Violin & Piano, Op. 53
 Elegy and Caprice Slave for Cello & Piano, Op. 98
 Suite for Violin and Piano, Op. 99
 Piano Trio No. 2 in C sharp minor, Op. 100
 4 Konzertstücke for Violin & Piano, Op. 104
 Piano Trio No. 3 in A major, Op. 105
 Viola Sonata in G minor, Op. 106
 Violin Sonata No.1 in B minor, Op. 110
 Piano Trio No. 4 in G major, Op. 112
 Violin Sonata No.2 in E minor, Op. 114
 Cello Sonata in G minor, Op. 116
 String Quartet No.1 in D minor, Op. 117
 Piano Quintet in B minor, Op. 118
 String Quartet No.2 in D major, Op. 120
 Piano Trio No. 5 in E minor, Op.121

Voice 
 Sakuntala for choir and orchestra on a text by Carl Wittkowsky, WoO (1884)
 5 Songs, Op. 28
 Dörpertanzweise for Soprano, Alto, Baritone, Bass, and Piano, Op. 35
 Die Lindenwirthin, Songs for Voice & Piano, Op. 62a
 3 Lieder for Voice & Piano, Op. 62b
 3 Lieder for Voice & Piano, Op. 88
 Abendfeier in Venedig, Op. 89
 3 Gesänge for Choir a capella, Op. 90
 3 Gesänge, Op. 102a
 2 Gesänge, Op. 102b
 4 Songs on Russian Texts, Op. 111
 An den König for Soprano, Alto, Baritone, Bass, and Organ, Op. 113
 3 Gesänge for Three-Part Female Choir and Piano, Op. 119

Piano 
 Polish Dance for Piano, Op. 3
 Capriccietto for Piano, D minor, Op. 4
 3 Scènes de Dance for Piano, Op. 5
 Scènes de Dance for Piano, Op. 6
 Phantasiestück for Piano, Op. 11
 Introduction & Polonaise pathétique for Piano, Op. 12
 Humoreske und Mazurka for piano, Op. 13
 2 Nocturnes for Piano, Op. 16
 Miscellen, 6 Piano Pieces, Op. 18
 Tanz-Suite for Piano 4-Hands, Op. 21
 Hochzeitsmusik (Wedding Music) for Piano 4 hands, Op. 23
 Menuett & Perpetuum Mobile for Violin & Piano, Op. 24
 Capriccio (No.1) for Piano, Op. 25
 5 Fantasiestücke for Piano, Op. 26b?
 Albumblätter, 5 kleine Stücke for Piano, Op. 27
 3 Mazurkas for Piano, Op. 29
 2 Pieces for Piano 4-Hands, Op. 30
 3 Humoresken for Piano, Op. 31
 In Bunter Reihe, 6 Pieces for Piano, Op. 32
 Album polonais for Piano, Op. 33
 Aus der Jugendzeit, 10 easy Piano Pieces, Op. 34
 Bergfahrt, 12 Klavierstücke, Op. 36
 Polnische Tanzweisen, Op. 38
 4 Bagatelles for Piano, Op. 39
 5 Piano Pieces, Op. 41
 3 Pieces for Piano Four-Hands, Op. 42
 Festklänge für die Jugend, 8 Piano Pieces, Op. 45
 4 Moments Musicaux for Piano, Op. 46
 Capriccio (No.2) for Piano, Op. 47
 5 Intermezzi for Piano, Op. 48
 5 Improvisations for Piano, Op. 49
 Scherzo in B flat minor for Piano, Op. 50
 Lieder und Tanzweisen for Piano 4-Hands, Op. 54
 Divertimenti, 10 Piano Pieces, Op. 55
 3 Pieces for Piano 4-hands, Op. 56
 Stimmungsbilder, 6 Pieces for Piano 4-hands, Op. 57
 Zum Vortrag, 9 Leichte & Mittelschwere Klavierstücke, Op. 58
 Herbstbilder, 6 Klavierstücke for Piano 4-Hands, Op. 59
 6 Seestücke nach Texten von Heinrich Heine for Piano, Op. 60
 Piano Sonata No. 1 in A major, Op. 61a
 Piano Sonata No. 2 in F sharp minor, Op. 61b
 Piano Sonata No. 3 in G minor, Op. 61c
 Lose Blätter, 5 Klavierstücke, Op. 63
 Kinderspiele I, 8 easy Piano Pieces, Op. 64
 5 Romantische Episoden for Piano, Op. 65
 3 Tanz-Kaprizen for Piano, Op. 66
 6 Klavierstücke, Op. 67
 Kinderspiele II, 8 Leichte Stücke for piano, Op. 68
 6 Tonbilder in Kleinem Rahmen for Piano Op. 69
 2 Ländler for Piano Op. 70a
 3 Tänze: Menuett, Mazurka, & Waltz for Piano, Op. 70b
 Für die Jugend for Piano, Op. 71
 Aus Vergangenen Tagen, 5 Phantasiestücke for Piano, Op. 72
 5 Impromptus for Piano, Op. 73
 2 Elegische Gesänge for Piano, Op. 74
 5 Tanzscenen for Piano 4-Hands, Op. 75
 4 Klavierstücke, Op. 77
 Suite de Danses caractéristiques for Piano, Op. 78
 8 Vortragsstücke for Piano, Op. 79
 6 Vortragsstücke in leichter Spielart for Piano, Op. 80
 7 Piano Pieces, Op. 81
 Lyrische Episoden, 6 Piano Pieces, Op. 82
 5 Klavierstücke, Op. 83
 Skizzen, 5 Piano Pieces, Op. 84
 2 Rhapsodieen for Piano, Op. 85
 2 Tanz-Impromptus for Piano, Op. 86
 3 Scherzi for Piano Duet, Op. 91
 4 Mazurkas for Piano, Op. 93
 Ballade for Piano, Op. 94a
 Nachtstück for Piano, Op. 94b
 4 Klavierstücke, Op. 97
 5 Klavierstücke, Op. 101
 Tanz-Novelle, 5 Tanzpoëme for Piano 4-Hands, Op. 103
 Abendstimmungen, 6 Piano Pieces, Op. 107
 Heimat, 5 Phantasietänze in polnischer Art for Piano 4-hands, Op. 109

Notes

External links 
Image of Philipp Scharwenka on German Wikipedia, :de:Philipp Scharwenka
 Philipp Scharwenka String Quartet No.1, Op.117, Violin Sonata, Op.110 soundbites, discussion of work & short biography
 
 Philipp Scharwenka - German Composer on Flickr - Photo Sharing! at www.flickr.com Philipp Scharwenka's signature, illustration and note to wife, Marianne Scharwenka
 Scores by Philipp Scharwenka in digital library Polona

1847 births
1917 deaths
19th-century classical composers
19th-century classical pianists
19th-century German composers
19th-century German male musicians
20th-century classical composers
20th-century classical pianists
20th-century German composers
20th-century German male musicians
German classical pianists
German male classical composers
German music educators
German opera composers
German Romantic composers
Male classical pianists
Male opera composers
People from Szamotuły
People from the Grand Duchy of Posen
Piano pedagogues
Polish classical pianists
Polish male classical composers
Polish music educators
Polish opera composers
Polish Romantic composers